Fakhruddin As'ad Gurgani, also spelled as Fakhraddin Asaad Gorgani, was an 11th-century Persian poet. He versified the story of Vis and Rāmin, a story from the Arsacid (Parthian) period. The Iranian scholar Abdolhossein Zarrinkoub, however, disagrees with this view, and concludes that the story has its origins in the 5th-century Sasanian era.  Besides Vis and Rāmin, he composed other forms of poetry.  For example, some of his quatrains are recorded in the Nozhat al-Majales.

Biography 
Fakhruddin As'ad Gurgani was born in Jorjan or Gorgan (Persian: گرگان, also Romanized as Gorgān, central city of Hyrcania in north of Iran.

Gurgani accompanied the Seljuq ruler Tughril during his campaigns in Iran. When Tughril seized the major Iranian city of Isfahan from the Kakuyids in 1051, he appointed a certain Amid Abu'l-Fath Muzaffar as its governor. Gurgani thereafter settled in Isfahan, where he established good relations with its governor, who took him under his protection.

One day, when Gurgani and Abu'l-Fath Muzaffar were talking, Abu'l-Fath Muzaffar asked the following question: “What do you say about the tale of Vis and Rāmin?” Gurgani then told him that the story was only written in Middle Persian. Abu'l-Fath Muzaffar then asked Gurgani to versify the story, which he did; during the Mehregan festival, Gurgani presented the poem to him, in which he praises Tughril, the vizier Abu Nasr Kunduri, and Abu'l-Fath Muzaffar. Gurgani died .

Influence 

The Vis and Ramin story had a noticeable influence on Persian literature. Significantly, Nezami, himself a major poet of Persian romantic traditions, took the bases of much of his rhetoric from Gorgani. The romance also has had its influence beyond Persian culture. The story became very popular also in Georgia through a 12th-century free translation in prose known as Visramiani, which had a long-lasting effect on the Georgian literature. Being the oldest known manuscript of the work and better preserved than the original, it is of great importance for the history of the Persian text and helps restore several corrupted lines in the Persian manuscripts.

Some scholars have suggested that Vis and Ramin may have influenced the Tristan and Iseult legend, and the two plots have distinct resemblances. Nevertheless, views have differed about the connection between these two stories.

References

Sources

 Gorgani, Le roman de Vis et Ramin, traduit par Henri Massé, Société d'Edition Les Belles Lettres, Paris 1959
 Jan Rypka, History of Iranian Literature. Reidel Publishing Company.    
 Vīs and Rāmīn, by Fakhr al-Dīn Gurgānī, translated from Persian by George Morrison, UNESCO Collection of Representative Works: Persian heritage series, no. 14, xix, 357 p. (Columbia University Press, New York, 1972). .
 Pierre Gallais, Genèse du roman occidental. Essais sur Tristan et Iseut et son modèle persan, Sirac, Paris 1974
 Gorgani, Fakhraddin. Vis and Ramin Trans. Dick Davis. Washington DC: Mage, February 2008 .  Now available as a Penguin Classic 
 Nahid Norozi, Esordi del romanzo persiano. Dal Vis e Ramin di Gorgani (XI sec.) al ciclo di Tristano, preface by F. Benozzo, Mimesis Edizioni, Roma 2021
 

People from Gorgan
11th-century Persian-language poets
Year of birth unknown
1058 deaths
11th-century Iranian people